France competed at the 2018 European Athletics Championships in Berlin, Germany, from 6–12 August 2018. A delegation of 84 athletes were sent to represent the country.

Results

Men 

Track and road events

Field events

Combined events – Decathlon

Women 

Track and road events

Field events

Combined events – Heptathlon

References

Nations at the 2018 European Athletics Championships
France at the European Athletics Championships
European Athletics Championships